Andrea Arnold, OBE (born 5 April 1961) is an English filmmaker and former actor. She won an Academy Award for her short film Wasp in 2005. Her feature films include Red Road (2006), Fish Tank (2009), and American Honey (2016), all of which have won the Jury Prize at the Cannes Film Festival. Arnold has also directed four episodes of the Amazon Prime Video series Transparent, as well as all seven episodes of the second season of the HBO series Big Little Lies. Her documentary Cow premiered at the 2021 Cannes Film Festival and played at the 2021 Telluride Film Festival.

Early life
Arnold was born in Dartford, Kent, the eldest of four children. She was born when her mother was only 16 years old and her father was 17, and they separated when she was very young. Growing up on a council estate, she spent her youth days constantly exploring the "chalk pits, fields, woods and motorways" of Dartford. Her mother had to bring up all four children alone, which is reminiscent of the narrative in Arnold's third short film, Wasp. When asked if the story is in any way autobiographical, Arnold replies "I grew up in a working class family, so I guess you could say I write from what I know."

As a young girl, she was writing dark stories about human experience. In an interview, Arnold speaks about how when she was 10 years old, she wrote her first play that expressed her "horror" of the slave trade, and a few years later while studying for a dance GCSE, she made a performance piece; "I took quotes from The Diary of Anne Frank and read them aloud as I moved around the room. All the other kids would just bung on some pop music and dance. I remember the examiners sitting there looking at me, perplexed." Arnold left school when she was 16, when she was drawn to becoming an actor. When Arnold was 18 years old she began working as a host and actor for a children's TV show called No. 73. She worked in TV for the next 10 years while continually writing on the side. Arnold realized she could turn her stories into films so she studied at the American Film Institute of Los Angeles, where she gained experience in the film industry. In explaining why she moved from London to study film in the U.S. she states, "I felt my lack of education and accent always held me back in the eyes of the gatekeepers". After finishing her studies and returning to Britain she had her daughter, Coral, and began making short films for TV.

Career

Early TV work
After leaving school in the late 1970s, Arnold got her first TV jobs as a dancer on shows that included Top of the Pops. She first came to prominence as an actor and television presenter alongside Sandi Toksvig, Nick Staverson and Neil Buchanan in the 1980s children's television show No. 73. This Saturday morning show on ITV, in which she played Dawn Lodge, had a similar premise to that of The Kumars at No. 42 in the way that the show was part sitcom, part chat show and based at a domestic residence. In addition to these parts, the show had the usual mix of music, competitions and cartoons that was in keeping to the formula of British Saturday morning children's TV of the 1980s. After a couple of years of experience in front of the camera, Arnold realized, "Television was great fun and I went along for the ride, but I never felt that comfortable in front of the camera".

In 1988 No. 73 had morphed into 7T3, with the set being moved from the Maidstone house (in fact in TVS studios in Kent) to that of a theme park. This revamp would only last the season, but Arnold would be seen for another two years in the same timeslot as part of the Motormouth presenting team. In 1990 she presented and wrote for the environmental awareness show for teens, A Beetle Called Derek. This also featured Benjamin Zephaniah and gave exposure to The Yes/No People of Stomp fame.

Directing
After retiring from her career as a television presenter, Arnold studied directing at the AFI Conservatory in Los Angeles and trained in screenwriting at the PAL Labs in Kent. Her early short films included Milk (1998), which premiered at the International Critics' Week Cannes, and Dog (2001). She won the Academy Award for Best Live Action Short Film for Wasp, in 2004.

She was named a Screen International Star of Tomorrow. Also in 2003, she directed an episode of the Channel 4 series Coming Up titled "Bed Bugs", though she is sometimes erroneously credited as "Andrew Arnold" for the work.

Red Road is the first instalment of Advance Party, a planned set of three conceptually-related films by different first-time directors. Set on a housing estate in Glasgow, the revenge-themed story centres on a CCTV (security TV cameras) operator who develops an obsession with someone she observes, for reasons that become clear through the progress of the film. The picture has won the British director comparisons with established names such as Michael Haneke and Lars von Trier. Screen International critic Allan Hunter said the film was "likely to emerge as one of the discoveries of this year's Cannes Film Festival (2006)." It went on to win the Jury Prize at Cannes that year.

She won the 2007 BAFTA Award for Outstanding Debut by a British Writer, Director or Producer for directing Red Road. In 2008, Arnold was reported to be directing an adaptation of Gillian Flynn's novel Sharp Objects for French production company Pathé, but the project never materialized. In 2011, she was reported to be working on a television project with writer Danny Brocklehurst called Dirty, but this project also failed to materialize.

Her 2009 film Fish Tank premiered at the 62nd Cannes Film Festival, where she once again won the Jury Prize. The film also went on to win the BAFTA Award for Outstanding British Film in 2010. In 2011, she completed shooting an adaptation of Emily Brontë's Wuthering Heights, produced by London's Ecosse Films. The film was shown in competition at the 68th Venice International Film Festival in September where it won the Golden Osella for Best Cinematography.

She was appointed Officer of the Order of the British Empire (OBE) in the 2011 New Year Honours for services to the film industry.

In 2015, it was announced that she would direct two episodes of the Amazon Studios series Transparent.

Wasp
Initially released in 2003, Wasp was a short (26 minutes) written and directed by Arnold. It stars Natalie Press as a struggling single mother determined not to let her four young children prove an obstacle in the pursuit of igniting a relationship with an old friend (Danny Dyer). Arnold's native Dartford is the setting. The film was commissioned by the UK Film Council and the Britain's Channel 4. It won the Sundance Short Film Prize in 2005, and won Arnold an Oscar for Best Live Action Short Film.

Red Road
Red Road was a 2006 film that is a part of a creative series proposed by the Advance Party of Filmmakers to create three films using the same characters, all directed by different new directors. It tells the story of a CCTV security operator who observes through her monitors a man from her past. It is named after, and partly set at, the Red Road flats in Barmulloch, Glasgow, Scotland which were the tallest residential buildings in Europe at the time they were built. It is shot largely in a Dogme 95 style, using handheld cameras and natural light.

One rule was that if any of the directors decide to incorporate a new main character, then all of the other films must incorporate that character as well. All three directors cast together so they could all see who they believed would fit their film as well as the others. Arnold mainly used first-time actors, stating that "I always want the world that I create to be its own universe. When you have really famous people, I find that it is very hard to transcend that awareness. I am always aware of who they are. When you see someone for the first time, that universe feels even more real. I like the idea of working with either unknowns or people that haven't even acted before." Red Road cost $1 million to make and was shot digitally on a schedule of six weeks. The film was accepted into competition for the Palme d'Or in Cannes and received the Jury Prize.

Fish Tank
Fish Tank premiered in 2009 and was accepted into competition for the Palme d'Or at the Cannes Film Festival and received the Jury Prize. In its initial production, distributor Artificial Eye had acquired the UK theatrical rights, while ContentFilm International handled the worldwide sales. The film was backed by the Limelight Fund, BBC Films and the UK Film Council's New Cinema Fund. The film was shot entirely on location in the UK. Arnold was adamant about shooting the film in chronological order, so that the journey of the film would make sense to new coming actor Katie Jarvis. She would only give her a day's worth of script to study so that she could take it day by day. The film originally premiered on around 45–50 screens in Britain, making them less accessible to the general public. In regards to this, Arnold said, "I definitely feel sorry more people don't get to see my films. They aren't inaccessible, and if people got the chance to see them, I know they'd like them. I wish cinema [owners] could be braver, or had more money to help them show films like mine." The film cost around $2 million to make, which is still a relatively low budget for a feature-length film. Fish Tank won many awards including the best film award at the Evening Standard Film Awards. Fish Tank was released on 11 September 2009. The film and Arnold were honoured at the 20th Annual Women in Film and TV Awards in 2010.

Wuthering Heights
Arnold's third film was based on Emily Brontë's 1847 novel and starred Kaya Scodelario and James Howson. This is the first film that Arnold has directed which she did not write herself, though she did co-write the screenplay. Originally, the film adaptation was set to be directed by Peter Webber, who directed Girl with a Pearl Earring, but Arnold was asked to take over and gladly accepted. The film was made in 18 months, which is half the amount of time Arnold used to make Red Road and Fish Tank. Oscilloscope Laboratories picked up the North American distribution rights to the adaptation, which won Best Cinematography at the Venice Film Festival in 2011, being praised for its visuals.

American Honey

Arnold's fourth film, American Honey, revolves around a group of young adults traveling across the country selling magazine subscriptions. The meandering plot focuses on the journey of the mag-crew kids as they drink, smoke, dance, joke around, and have various conversations in their van. The film had its world premiere and competed for Palme d'Or at the 2016 Cannes Film Festival. It won Arnold her third Jury Prize. The film features a mix of both professional and non-actors, with all the non-actors being found through construction sites, parking lots, and on beaches. Out of the 15 youth actors cast, 11 had never acted before. The lead Sasha Lane was spotted by Arnold on a beach during spring break. Arnold shot the film in chronological sequence, not telling her actors where they were going next. The film was released in the United States on 30 September 2016, and in the United Kingdom on 14 October 2016, by A24 and Focus Features respectively.

Cow
Arnold's 2021 documentary Cow is a portrait of a dairy-farm cow's life span.

Work with film festivals
Arnold has been very active in working with film festivals around the world. She has been described as a "film festival regular even between films." In 2012 she was a member of the Jury for the Main Competition at the 2012 Cannes Film Festival. In 2013 she was named as a member of the jury at the 70th Venice International Film Festival. In 2014 Arnold was announced as the chair of the jury for International Critics' Week at the 2014 Cannes Film Festival. In 2016, Arnold was chosen to take part in a public conversation about her career as part of the Tribeca Film Festival's "Tribeca Talks" programme. Arnold was a jury member of the 2017 Sheffield Doc/Fest.

In September 2013, Arnold was named the New York Film Festival's inaugural "Filmmaker in Residence." As the first "Filmmaker in Residence," Arnold was responsible for "creating a template for the programme." The programme is designed to "further the goals of filmmakers at an earlier stage in the creative process." Through the programme, Arnold was given the "opportunity to focus on developing or refining new work, and participate in master classes, mentorships or cultural exchange and enrichment film programmes with the Film Society of Lincoln Center members, the film community and the public."

Andrea Arnold was named to as Chair of the European Film Festival of Les Arcs, which ran from 16 to 23 December 2017.

Styles and themes
Throughout all of her films, Arnold is known for giving her actors almost total control in creating their characters. Her directorial style provides support and reassurance to her actors in an effort to create their most pure reflections of themselves. Sasha Lane, star of American Honey, describes that "She constantly told me to be who I was. There wasn't really any teaching.  More like, 'Sasha, you're fine.'"

In general, Arnold's films are characterized by the themes of deprivation and impoverishment. For example, both Fish Tank and Wuthering Heights are dramas featuring teenagers living in the poverty-stricken English edge-lands.

Personal life
Arnold lives in Greenwich, London, with her daughter.

In 2012, Arnold embarked on an impulsive road-trip of the continental United States which she states partially inspired the premise of her 2016 feature American Honey.

Filmography

Film

Television

Selected awards and honors

 2005 Academy Award for Best Live Action Short Film – Wasp
 2006 Jury Prize at Cannes – Red Road
 2007 BAFTA Award for Outstanding Debut by a British Writer, Director or Producer – Red Road
 2009 British Independent Film Award for Best Director of a British Independent Film – Fish Tank
 2009 Jury Prize at Cannes – Fish Tank
 2010 BAFTA Award for Outstanding British Film – Fish Tank
 2011 Officer of the Order of the British Empire
 2012 FIPRESCI Prize at International Istanbul Film Festival – Wuthering Heights
 2013 New York Film Festival Filmmaker in Residence
 2015 Honorary Doctorate of Letters from the University of Sussex
 2015 Masterclass Lecturer at Falmouth University
 2016 Jury Prize at Cannes – American Honey

Further reading
Director Leaps From Shorts to Longing, The New York Times 1 April 2007
 Dark depths of Andrea Arnold's Wuthering Heights The Telegraph 5 Nov 2011
Film: Andrea Arnold interview The Scotsman 28 August 2009
Arnold, "I Wish Cinema Could Be Braver" The Telegraph 28 August 2009

See also

 List of film and television directors
 List of female film and television directors
 List of British film directors
 Women's cinema

References

External links

 
 
 Cannes director urges CCTV debate, BBC News Online, 20 May 2006
 'I like darkness', The Guardian, 18 October 2006
 Cannes Film Festival, Andrea Arnold
 
 

1961 births
Outstanding Debut by a British Writer, Director or Producer BAFTA Award winners
Directors of Live Action Short Film Academy Award winners
AFI Conservatory alumni
English women film directors
English television actresses
English television presenters
English women writers
British women screenwriters
English screenwriters
Living people
Officers of the Order of the British Empire
British women film directors
English television directors
British women television directors
WFTV Award winners
People from Dartford